The Last Hour is a 1928 comedy thriller play by the British writer Charles Bennett. At an inn on the coast of Devon, a secret agent battles a foreign prince trying to smuggle a stolen death ray out of the country.

It ran for 111 performances at the Comedy Theatre in London's West End between 20 December 1928 and 23 March 1929. The cast included Cyril Raymond, Lydia Sherwood, Edward O'Neill and Franklin Dyall.

Film adaptation
In 1930 it was made into a British film The Last Hour directed by Walter Forde and starring Stewart Rome and Kathleen Vaughan.

References

Bibliography
 Goble, Alan. The Complete Index to Literary Sources in Film. Walter de Gruyter, 1999.
 Kabatchnik, Amnon. Blood on the Stage, 1925-1950: Milestone Plays of Crime, Mystery and Detection. Scarecrow Press, 2010.
 Wearing, J. P. The London Stage 1920-1929: A Calendar of Productions, Performers, and Personnel. Rowman & Littlefield, 2014.

1928 plays
Plays by Charles Bennett
British plays adapted into films
Thriller plays
West End plays